The little bittern or common little bittern (Ixobrychus minutus) is a wading bird in the heron family, Ardeidae. Ixobrychus is from Ancient Greek ixias, a reed-like plant and brukhomai, to bellow, and minutus is Latin for "small".

Distribution
The little bittern is native to the Old World, breeding in Africa, central and southern Europe, western and southern Asia, and Madagascar. Birds from temperate regions in Europe and western Asia are migratory, wintering in Africa and further south in Asia, while those nesting in the tropics are sedentary. It is rare north of its breeding range.

In Britain  there were intermittent reports of breeding in the nineteenth century,  and again in 1946 and 1957, but none of these records were proven. The first proven British breeding record is from Yorkshire in 1984, and the second from the Avalon Marshes in Somerset  in  2010, by 2017 this species had been present in this area for nine consecutive years.

Taxonomy
Carl Linnaeus described the little bittern in 1766. Member of a cosmopolitan superspecies with I. exilis (North and South America), I. sinensis (Asia) and I. dubius (New Guinea, AUS). I. [m.] minutus itself consists of three clearly differentiated subspecies (groups) to which all-species status could be assigned:
 I. m. minutus – (Linnaeus, 1766): nominate, found in Europe, Asia, northern Africa; winters in sub-Saharan Africa and southern Asia
 I. m. payesii – (Hartlaub, 1858): found in sub-Saharan Africa, resident
 I. m. podiceps – (Bonaparte, 1855): found in Madagascar, resident

The Australian little bittern (I. dubius) and the extinct New Zealand little bittern (I. novaezelandiae) were formerly considered subspecies of the little bittern.

Comparative studies, especially on shouting / courtship behavior and genetics, are lacking.

Description

It is the smallest of the breeding herons of Europe and is characterised by its tiny size, long and sharp bill and thick neck. The males are distinctively patterned and both sexes show pale forewing panels. The males have black with a faint green sheen on the crown, nape, back, tail and scapulars. The underparts are pale buff and the wing has a pinkish buff oval shaped panel which contrasts with the otherwise black wings and is formed by the inner wing coverts. The underwing is completely whiteish in colour. The female is duller than the male and has brownish black upperparts with paler feather margins visible at close range. The underparts of the female are not as clean as those of the male and are streaked with dark buff and brown. The female's wing panel is less obvious than the male's. The juveniles are duller and more rufous than the females and are more heavily streaked on both their upperparts and underparts, including their wing coverts.

Status
Little Bitterns were once widespread in Central Europe. In the meantime it is a poorly distributed breeding bird of the lowlands, sporadically up to low mountain ranges. It occurs from Europe (without regular breeding in Great Britain, Ireland or Scandinavia) to West Siberia up to 56° N. It also occurs in North Africa and southern Iran and south of the Sahara to southern Africa. Isolated populations also exist in Madagascar and Australia. The total population of Europe is about 60,000-120,000 breeding pairs, with occurrences of> 5000 breeding pairs in Russia, Ukraine, Romania and Turkey. In Central Europe (around 2000) about 5300-7800 pairs are breeding, most of it in Hungary. The formerly large population in Germany has decreased to just over 100 breeding pairs. However, inventory information is particularly unreliable for this very secret species.

The little bittern is one of the species to which the Agreement on the Conservation of African-Eurasian Migratory Waterbirds applies.

Behaviour
The little bittern is crepuscular, skulking and normally solitary. It feeds on fishes, amphibians and insects which are caught within reedbeds or at their edges by the bird slowly stalking the prey. The male claims a territory in the Spring, advertising his presence with a deep  barking or croaking call and the monogamous pair remain together for at least one breeding season. Eggs are laid in a nest situated in dense reedbeds, rushes or bushes above the water from the middle of May and there is a single brood which is normally 5-6 eggs. These are incubated for 17–19 days and the chicks are fledged after 25–30 days.

In Europe the little bittern is a migratory species, crossing the Mediterranean from Africa in the early Spring and arriving in their breeding wetlands from mid April onwards. The return to Africa occurs in August and September and there are normally only a few juveniles left in Europe by October. The European breeders migrate as far south as the Eastern Cape and Transvaal.

References

External links

 Little Bittern, The Atlas of Southern African Birds
 
 
 
 
 
 

little bittern
little bittern
Birds of Europe
Birds of Africa
Birds of Central Asia
Birds of Western Asia
little bittern
little bittern